Khanpur Union is a Union Parishad under Bagerhat Sadar Upazila of Bagerhat District in the division of Khulna, Bangladesh. It has an area of 55.32 km2 (21.36 sq mi) and a population of 18,986.

References

Unions of Bagerhat Sadar Upazila
Unions of Bagerhat District
Unions of Khulna Division